Dunning Brook flows into the Sacandaga River north of Wells, New York. The creek drains Charley Lake, Gilman Lake, and Dunning Pond.

References 

Rivers of New York (state)
Tributaries of the Sacandaga River